Vasylivka may refer to several places in Ukraine:

Vasylivka Raion, one of five districts of Zaporizhzhia Oblast
Vasylivka, a city there and administrative center of the Raion
, a village
Vasylivka, Ochakiv urban hromada, Mykolaiv Raion, Mykolaiv Oblast, a village
Vasylivka, Donetsk Oblast, a village
Vasylivka, Bolhrad Raion, Odesa Oblast, a village
Vasylivka, Odesa Raion, Odesa Oblast, a village
Vasylivka, Izmail Raion, Odesa Oblast, a village